Asioita joista vaietaan (‘Things that people keep quiet about’) is the debut LP by the Finnish gospel artist Jaakko Löytty, released in 1974 by Kirkon nuorisotyön keskus (‘Church centre for youth work’) as NKLP-2. It was one of the first gospel album released in Finland, preceded perhaps only by the LP Ihminen by the  Helsinki group Dominicones (1973, NKLP-1) and the album Hän muutti kaiken by the group Pro Fide, likewise released in 1973.

Original vinyl release
Words and music by Jaakko Löytty, except where otherwise stated.
Side one

Side two

Musicians
Jaakko Löytty — vocals, acoustic guitar, harmonica, piano, organ
Jouko Laivuori — piano, organ
Tarvo Laakso — guitar, percussion
Seppo Lindell — basso, guitar
Sakari Löytty — drums, percussion, banjo

References

External links
Asioita joista vaietaan in Discogs

Jaakko Löytty albums
1974 debut albums